The 2019 Abu Dhabi Grand Prix (formally known as the Formula 1 Etihad Airways Abu Dhabi Grand Prix 2019) was a Formula One motor race that was held on 1 December 2019 at the Yas Marina Circuit in Abu Dhabi, United Arab Emirates. The race was the twenty first and final round of the 2019 Formula One World Championship and marked the eleventh running of the Abu Dhabi Grand Prix and the eleventh time that the race was run as a World Championship event since the inaugural event in 2009. It was the final race for Toro Rosso, as the team was rebranded to AlphaTauri for the  season.

Background

Championship standings before the race 
Heading into the race weekend the top two places in the World Drivers' Championship had already been determined with Lewis Hamilton as champion ahead of teammate Valtteri Bottas. However third place was yet to be decided between Max Verstappen, 260 points and Charles Leclerc, 249 points, with Sebastian Vettel, 230 points, still able to overtake Leclerc for fourth place in the standings but too far behind Verstappen to take third. The top four places in the World Constructors' Championship were decided with Mercedes in first ahead of Ferrari, Red Bull and McLaren. Fifth place was still undecided with Renault eight points ahead of Toro Rosso.

Entries

The drivers and teams entered were the same as those for the previous race with no additional stand-in drivers for the race or practice.

Practice 
The first session saw the red flag come out twice. The first time when Daniel Ricciardo suffered an engine failure and a second time after Sebastian Vettel crashed his car at turn 19 in the closing minutes of the session, after which the session was not restarted. The session ended with Valtteri Bottas fastest followed by Max Verstappen and Lewis Hamilton. The second practice session saw one red flag after Bottas and Romain Grosjean collided at turn 11, Bottas would later receive a reprimand for the incident. Bottas finished the session fastest ahead of Hamilton and Charles Leclerc. The third practice session ran uninterrupted and ended with Verstappen fastest followed by Hamilton and Bottas.

Qualifying

Qualifying classification

Notes
  – Valtteri Bottas was required to start from the back of the grid for exceeding his quota for power unit components.

Race 
Prior to the race, it was announced that the fuel mass in Charles Leclerc's car as declared by Ferrari was "significantly different" to the amount measured by the FIA. It was decided that this would be investigated by the stewards after the race.

The front-runners all maintained their positions into the first corner, with Lewis Hamilton leading from pole position. Further back down the grid, Lance Stroll collided with the rear of Pierre Gasly, causing Gasly to make contact with Sergio Pérez in front of him and resulting in Gasly losing his front wing. Gasly was forced to pit for a replacement which caused him to drop to the back of the grid, over a minute behind 19th place. The incident was not investigated by the stewards. Max Verstappen lost 2nd place to Leclerc on the straight between turns 7 and 8, meanwhile Valtteri Bottas had made up five places on the first lap after starting in last place.

On lap 4 it was announced that DRS was disabled for all cars due to a technical issue. It was later revealed that the system was deliberately disabled by the race director after a server crash caused communications with the cars to be disrupted, meaning that it could not be ensured that cars only used DRS in the permitted zones of the track. Shortly after, Stroll complained of difficulties caused by damage from his first lap collision with Gasly. Stroll would later go on to retire from a brake problem after running near the back for most of the race. Lando Norris was the first driver to make a scheduled pit stop on lap 8. Ferrari brought both drivers in for pit stops on lap 12, with Sebastian Vettel suffering with a slow stop causing him to be stationary for nearly 7 seconds.

DRS was eventually enabled on lap 18. Bottas passed Nico Hülkenberg on the same lap to clear the midfield after starting from the back. Robert Kubica and Antonio Giovinazzi both suffered floor damage after colliding during an overtake attempt by Giovinazzi. Verstappen pitted from 2nd on lap 25, followed by Hamilton a lap later who maintained the lead upon exiting the pits. Bottas was the last of the front-runners to pit on lap 29. No positions were gained or lost amongst the top six after the round of pit stops. On lap 32, Verstappen retook 2nd place from Leclerc going into turn 8, having lost the position on the first lap. The Ferrari drivers made a second round of pit stops on lap 38, with Leclerc maintaining 3rd and Vettel dropping from 4th to 6th. Bottas passed Alexander Albon for 4th place soon afterwards.

On lap 41, Carlos Sainz Jr. made a second pit stop from 9th place after he was concerned that his ageing tyres would cause him to be overtaken towards the end of the race, losing a points-scoring position and handing 6th place in the World Drivers' Championship to Gasly. Sainz exited the pits in 14th place. The final two laps saw multiple overtakes; Vettel passed Albon for 5th place, Lando Norris lost 7th place to Pérez, and Sainz successfully passed Hülkenberg to take 10th place and claim a point, securing 6th place in the championship. Hamilton crossed the line to win the race, taking his 11th victory of the season and the 84th of his career. Having also led every lap, taken pole position and recorded the fastest lap of the race, this marked Hamilton's sixth "grand slam", his last of which came at the 2017 British Grand Prix.

Post-race, Ferrari were handed a €50,000 fine for the pre-race fuel infringement, although Leclerc was allowed to keep his 3rd-place finish. In an interview, Gasly said he was "disgusted" by the collision with Stroll at the start of the race, as his car "clearly had the potential to keep sixth place [in the drivers' championship]". Gasly ended the season in 7th place with 95 points, one short of Sainz's 96.

Race classification 

Notes
  – Includes one point for fastest lap.

Final Championship standings 

Drivers' Championship standings

Constructors' Championship standings

 Note: Only the top five positions are included for both sets of standings.
 Bold text indicates the 2019 World Champions.

See also 
2019 Yas Island Formula 2 round

References

Abu Dhabi Grand Prix
Abu Dhabi Grand Prix
Abu Dhabi Grand Prix
Abu Dhabi Grand Prix
Abu Dhabi Grand Prix